The second and final season of Witches of East End premiered on July 6, 2014, and concluded on October 5, 2014. It consisted of 13 episodes, each running 40–45 minutes approx. The series is based loosely on the book of the same by Melissa de la Cruz. The story takes place in East End focusing on a family of witches, led by Joanna Beauchamp (Julia Ormond). This season aired on Sundays at 9pm, followed by the new series The Lottery, and averaged 1.13 million viewers. On November 4, 2014, Lifetime cancelled Witches of East End due to low ratings in the second season.

Cast and characters

Main cast
Julia Ormond as Joanna Beauchamp
Mädchen Amick as Wendy Beauchamp
Jenna Dewan Tatum as Freya Beauchamp
Rachel Boston as Ingrid Beauchamp
Daniel Di Tomasso as Killian Gardiner/Edgar Allan Poe
Christian Cooke as Frederick Beauchamp
Eric Winter as Dash Gardiner

Recurring cast
Ignacio Serricchio as Tommy Cole/Rey Nikolaus (11 episodes)
Bianca Lawson as Eva/Selina (10 episodes)
James Marsters as Mason Tarkoff (7 episodes)
Anthony Konechny as the Mandragora (5 episodes)
Steven Berkoff as Rey Nikolaus (5 episodes)
Sarah Lancaster as Raven Moreau (4 episodes)
Joel Gretsch as Victor (3 episodes)
Shaun Smyth as Dr. Frank Foster (3 episodes)
Michelle Hurd as Alex (2 episodes)
Tom Lenk as Hudson Rafferty (2 episodes)

Guest cast
Rachel Nichols as Isis Zurka (1 episode)
Eddie McClintock as Ronan (1 episode)
Callard Harris as Ivar Zurka (1 episode)

Production
On November 22, 2013, Witches of East End was renewed by Lifetime for a 13-episode second season, which premiered on July 6, 2014. Christian Cooke joined this season as a series regular. James Marsters and Bianca Lawson guest starred this season, (Marsters guest starred as Tarkoff, an old friend of Joanna's; while Lawson played Eva, a mysterious woman who has a connection to Killian).

Episodes 
{| class="wikitable plainrowheaders" style="width:100%;"
|-
! scope="col" style="background:#A00000; color:#fff;"| No. inseries
! scope="col" style="background:#A00000; color:#fff;"| No. inseason
! scope="col" style="background:#A00000; color:#fff;"| Title
! scope="col" style="background:#A00000; color:#fff;"| Directed by
! scope="col" style="background:#A00000; color:#fff;"| Written by
! scope="col" style="background:#A00000; color:#fff;"| Original air date
! scope="col" style="background:#A00000; color:#fff;"| Productioncode
! scope="col" style="background:#A00000; color:#fff;"| U.S. viewers(million)
|-

|}

Ratings

U.S. ratings

References

Fiction set in 1848
2014 American television seasons
Witches of East End